The Daughter of Hamburg (French: La Fille de Hambourg, German Das Mädchen aus Hamburg) is a 1958 French drama film directed by Yves Allégret and starring Hildegarde Neff, Daniel Gélin and Jean Lefebvre. Location shooting took place around Hamburg, particularly around the red light district of St. Pauli.

Synopsis
When a French merchant ship arrives at the Port of Hamburg, the sailor Pierre searches for the young local woman he had once known in the city. He recalls the romance they had together when he was prisoner of war in the city during the Second World War. Eventually he finds her working in a nightclub.

Cast
 Daniel Gélin as Pierre
 Hildegarde Neff as Maria 
 Jean Lefebvre as Georges
 Daniel Sorano as Jean-Marie
 Frédéric O'Brady as 	Barman
 Reiner Brönneke as Pimp at Bar
 Bob Iller as 	Patron Sponging the Wrestling Winner
 Günther Jerschke as Heindrick the Patron Calling Gilda
 Kurt Klopsch as Julius the Cabaret Owner
 Maya Merlin as Mud Wrestler
 Reinhold Nietschmann as Aged Patron at Bar
 Karin Volkert as Blonde at Bar

Censorship 
When the film was first released in Italy in 1960 (Italian title: La Ragazza Di Amburgo) the Committee for the Theatrical Review of the Italian Ministry of Cultural Heritage and Activities rated the film not suitable for children under 16. The reason for the age restriction, cited in the official documents, is the presence of several scenes considered to be inappropriate to the sensitivity of a minor. For the film to be screened publicly, the Committee recommended the removal of the scene in which  Pierre and Maria are in bed and he is sensually kissing her on the neck. The committee considered this scene offensive to decency and morality. The official document number is: 31890, it was signed on 6 May 1960 by Minister Domenico Magrì.

References

Bibliography
 Broadbent, Philip & Hake, Sabine. Berlin Divided City, 1945-1989. Berghahn Books, 2010.

External links 
 

1958 films
1950s French-language films
Films directed by Yves Allégret
French drama films
Films set in Hamburg
Films set in West Germany
1958 drama films
1950s French films
Films shot in Hamburg
Pathé films

fr:La Fille de Hambourg